Grada Kilomba is a Portuguese interdisciplinary artist and writer whose works critically examine memory, trauma, gender, racism and post-colonialism. She uses various formats to express herself ranging from text to scenic reading and performance (performing knowledge). Moreover, she combines academic and lyrical narrative. In 2012, she was guest professor for gender and postcolonial studies at the Humboldt University of Berlin.

Life 
Grada Kilomba was born in Lisbon and is of West African descent (São Tomé and Príncipe and Angola). While practicing as a psychologist in Portugal, she worked in psychiatry with war-traumatised people from Angola and Mozambique and initiated various artistic and therapeutic projects on trauma and memory as well as on the work of Frantz Fanon. Grada Kilomba received a scholarship from the Heinrich Böll Foundation to pursue her PhD, which she completed in 2008 at the Free University of Berlin where she also worked as a guest lecturer.

From 2009 to 2010, she was a fellow at the Berlin Institute for Cultural Inquiry. In subsequent years, she taught post-colonial studies, psychoanalysis, and the work of Frantz Fanon at various universities, including the Free University of Berlin, Bielefeld University, and the University of Ghana. She was also Professor of Gender Studies and Postcolonial Studies at the Humboldt University in Berlin. There she conducted research on African diasporas, among other topics, and taught on decolonial feminism, decolonizing knowledge, and performing knowledge. She gives lectures in Europe and continuously exhibits her art in a variety of different group and solo exhibitions. 

Kilomba has commented on how early experiences of racism in post-fascist Portugal in the 1970s and 1980s shaped her world perceptions. In 2009, German  commented: "Her literary work combines post-colonial discourse and lyrical prose on the traces of slavery, colonialism and everyday racism".

Work 
Kilomba elaborates on her work that "My goal is to always appropriate the spaces with new knowledge configurations. It is a political work, parallel to my artistic work. The intention is to decolonize the discourse." In 2008, she became known to a wider audience through her book Plantation Memories (2008), a collection of episodes of everyday racism in the form of psychoanalytic short stories, first published for the International Literature Festival at the Haus der Berliner Festspiele. The short stories are based on the experiences by young Afro-German women and look at how everyday racism relates to the voice and the right to speak, hair politics, space, gender, trauma, skin politics and sexual politics. Kilomba asks, for instance:

In 2013, Kilomba adapted Plantation Memories (2008) as a scenic reading at the Ballhaus Naunynstraße theatre in Berlin. The theatre wrote about her work: "With her book, Plantation Memories – Episodes of Everyday Racism, Grada Kilomba succeeds in revealing the consequences of racist violence and racist traumata through her concise and profound language." "In her performances, Grada Kilomba brings the oral African tradition to a contemporary context, using texts, narration, images and video projections to recover the memories and realities of a postcolonial world."

In recent works, Kilomba has increasingly been concerned with the performative staging of theoretical and political texts, including the film Conakry (2013) about the African freedom fighter Amílcar Cabral. She has developed the short film with director Filipa César and radio editor and activist Diana McCarty.

Since 2015, Grada Kilomba has been developing the project "Decolonizing Knowledge: Performing Knowledge". Kampnagel writes about her lecture performance "Decolonizing Knowledge": "In her lecture performance, Grada Kilomba uncovers the violence of classical knowledge production and asks: What is recognized as knowledge? Whose knowledge is this? Who is allowed to produce knowledge at all? Kilomba touches this colonial wound by opening up a hybrid space in which the boundaries between academic and artistic language blur and the structures of knowledge and power transform."

Decolonizing Knowledge was shown at the University of Amsterdam, the University of Linköping (Sweden) and the Vienna Secession, among others. The project is accompanied by experimental videos such as While I Write (2015), in which Grada Kilomba explores the function of writing for postcolonial subjects. While I Write was premiered at the Vienna Secession in 2015. "Kilomba gives us a glimpse into our narcissistic society, which offers up little by way of symbols, images and vocabularies with which to deal with the present."

Publications 
 Plantation Memories. Episodes of Everyday Racism

"Don't You Call Me Neger!" – 
Rewriting the Black Body

Who can speak? Decolonizing Knowledge
Asking, We Walk: The South As New Political Imaginary

Exhibitions 
 Goodman Gallery Johannesburg, South Africa. Artwork: Speaking the Unspeakable (2018), 17 March – 14 April 2018
 10th Berlin Biennale for Contemporary Art, Berlin, Germany. Artwork: Illusions Vol. II, Oedipus (2018), 9 June - 9 September 2018
 Goodman Gallery, Booth R12, Basel, Switzerland. Artwork: Table Of Goods (2017), 13–16 June 2018
 Contemporary Art Gallery, Toronto, Canada. Solo Exhibition: Secrets To Tell, 23 June - 3 September 2018
 Goodman Gallery, Cape Town, South Africa. Group Exhibition: In Context This Past Was Waiting For Me, Artwork: Illusions Vol. II, Oedipus (2018), 30 August - 29 September 2018
Frieze Art Fair, Goodman Gallery, Booth A08, London, UK. Artwork: Illusions Vol. II, Oedipus (2018), 3–7 October 2018
 , São Paulo, Brazil. Group Exhibition: . Artwork: Plantation Memories (2018), 13 November 2018 - 10. January 2019
 E-Flux And Participant Inc., New York, USA. Group Exhibition: The Black City, Glosses. Artwork: Illusions Vol. I, Narcissus And Echo (2017), 2 December 2018 - 13. January 2019
 Verbier Art Summit, Verbier, Switzerland. Artwork: We Are Many. Art, The Political And Multiple Truths, 1–2 February 2019
 Pavilion Of Contemporary Art, Performing Pac, Milan, Italy. Artwork: Illusions Vol. II, Oedipus (2018), 1–3 March 2019
 Wilfried Lentz, Rotterdam, Netherlands. Artwork: lIlusions Vol. I And Vol. II. 6 February - 24 March 2019
 Kadist Art Foundation, Paris, France. Group Exhibition Affective Utopia, Artwork: lIlusions Vol. I And Vol. II, 9 Feb 2019 – 21 Apr 2019 
 Bildmuseet, Umeå University, Sweden. Solo Exhibition: A World of Illusions. 11 October 2019 - 8 March 2020
McLaughlin Gallery, Berlin, Germany. Solo Exhibition: The Words That Were Missing. 1 May 2021 - 12 Jun 2021
Rautenstrauch-Joest-Museum, Cologne, Germany. Group Exhibition: RESIST! The Art of Resistance, Artwork: Plantation Memories (2018), 1 April - 5 September 2021

Films 
 2011 White Charity by Carolin Philipp and Timo Kiesel
 2013 Conakry with Diana McCarty and Filipa César

References

External links 

White Charity (film)

1968 births
Living people
Portuguese women writers
Portuguese psychologists
Portuguese people of São Tomé and Príncipe descent
Portuguese people of Angolan descent
Portuguese women psychologists
Decolonial artists
Portuguese women artists
Portuguese artists
Gender studies academics
Portuguese women academics
People from Lisbon
Academic staff of the Humboldt University of Berlin
Portuguese expatriates in Germany
Portuguese contemporary artists